"I Turned You On" is a 1969 funk song by The Isley Brothers, released on their T-Neck imprint. The single was almost as big a hit as their predecessor, "It's Your Thing", reaching number six on the R&B chart and number twenty-three on the pop chart.

Background
The song's then-controversial usage of the popular sock it to me catchphrase (the song depicting sex) helped its popularity among fans.

Personnel
Ronald Isley: lead vocals
O'Kelly Isley, Jr. and Rudolph Isley: background vocals

Chart performance

References

1969 singles
The Isley Brothers songs
Songs written by Ronald Isley
Songs written by O'Kelly Isley Jr.
Songs written by Rudolph Isley
1969 songs
T-Neck Records singles